The Renick House, also known as "Paint Hill", is a historic house in western Chillicothe, Ohio, United States.  Built in 1804, it is a two-story stone structure in the shape of the letter "L".  Among its most prominent features are gables and large chimneys on each end, a massive central chimney, a central front entrance with a fanlight and a porch with decorative pediment. The house's sandstone façade is pierced by six openings: three windows on the second story and the door and two windows on the first.

This "Virginia-style" Federal house was built under the direction of Presley Morris. Its first inhabitant was prominent Chillicothe resident George Renick, who contributed to one of Ohio's first cattle drives; under his leadership, ninety-six cattle were moved from the Scioto River valley to Baltimore, Maryland.  Among the house's later owners was a Presbyterian congregation, which used it as a manse for its minister.  In 1904, the house was modified by the addition of an ell on one side.

In 1973, the Renick House was listed on the National Register of Historic Places.  It was eligible for the Register both because of its well-preserved historic architecture and its connection to George Renick.  One lesser building was sufficiently closely associated with the house that it qualified for inclusion with the house as a contributing property.

References

Houses completed in 1804
Buildings and structures in Chillicothe, Ohio
Federal architecture in Ohio
Houses on the National Register of Historic Places in Ohio
Clergy houses in the United States
Sandstone houses in the United States
Houses in Ross County, Ohio
National Register of Historic Places in Ross County, Ohio